Satkhira Medical College (SMC) is a government medical college in Bangladesh, established in 2011. It is located in the south-western city of Satkhira in Khulna Division.

It offers a five-year medical education course leading to an MBBS degree. A one-year internship after graduation is compulsory for all graduates. The degree is recognized by the Bangladesh Medical and Dental Council.

The 500 bed Medical College Hospital has emergency, ICU and CCU facilities. Area of this Medical College is about 45 acres.

History
 23 July 2010: Prime Minister Sheikh Hasina came to Satkhira to visit Cyclone Aila victims and promised to set up a Medical College in Satkhira.
 6 February 2011: In a conference, the prime minister first publicly committed to Satkhira Medical College.
 9 August 2011: The name of SMC was first published in the MBBS admission circular for the session 2011–12.
 16 October 2011: Satkhira Medical College officially launched. "Birthday" of SMC.(SMC Day)
 13 January 2012: 1st batch (SMC-01) orientation occurred. 
 23 January 2012: Academic activities of SMC began. "Anniversary of SMC-01."
 20 July 2012: The foundation stone of the permanent campus of SMC was laid by former Health Minister AFM Ruhul Haque.
 30 August 2013: The permanent campus was started at Bakal, Satkhira.
 4 April 2015: Health Minister Mohammed Nasim inaugurated the 500-bed Satkhira Medical College Hospital.
 22 May 2017: 1st batch started their internship in SMCH.

Current batches
As of January 2022, there are 11 batches. They are SMC-01, SMC-02, SMC-03, SMC-04, SMC-05, SMC-06, SMC-07, SMC-08, SMC-09, SMC-10 & SMC-11.
SMC-06 are now doing their internship after completing the five-year MBBS course. Other batches are in different years.

Every batch also has a name. 
SMC-01 : Agrodeep.
SMC-02 : Adommo.
SMC-03 : Spondon.
SMC-04 : Anuronon.
SMC-05 : Avijatrik.
SMC-06 : Aniruddho.
SMC-07 : Dipyoman.
SMC-08 : Nirantar.
SMC-09 : Durnibar. 
SMC-10 : Diptakkho.
SMC-11 : Arora

Principals
 SZ Atique (2012-2014)
 Kazi Habibur Rahman (2015–2021)
 Ruhul Quddus (2021- present)

Department
There are more than 60 teachers for delivering their excellency among 300 students of SMC.

Pre-clinical
 Anatomy
 Physiology
 Biochemistry

Para-Clinical
 Community Medicine
 Forensic Medicine 
 Pathology
 Pharmacology
 Microbiology

Clinical
 Medicine & Allied subjects
 Surgery & Allied Subjects
 Gynecology & Obstetrics

Hospital
There is a 500-bed hospital on the premises.

Facility
Indoor: 
 - Medicine
 - Surgery
 - Gynecology
 - Cardiology
 - ENT
 - Orthopedics
 - Pediatric Medicine
 - Pediatric Surgery
 - Urology
Outdoor:
 - Medicine
 - Surgery
 - Gynecology
 - Cardiology
 - ENT
 - Orthopedics
 - Pediatric Medicine
 - Pediatric Surgery
 - Urology
 - Neurology
 - Pulmonology
 - Ophthalmology
 - Physical Medicine & Rehabilitation
 - Transfusion Medicine
Emergency:
 - 24-hour emergency facility.
OT Complex: 
 - Total 22 OT Complex.
 - Ultra clean OT facility available.
 - 24-hour gynecology OT. 
ICU:
 - 10-bed ICU facility.
CCU:
 - 6-bed CCU facility.
Dialysis:
 - 14-bed dialysis unit.
 - 24-hour availability.
 Pathology & Blood Transfusion Dept.
 - Most of the pathological tests (80+ tests) are done here in a negligible cost.
 - Blood transfusion facility.
 Radiology & Imaging Dept.
 - MRI
 - CT Scan
 - X-Ray
 - Mammography
 - Ultrasonography
 - ECG
 - ETT
 - Endoscopy 
Institute of Nuclear Medicine & Allied Sciences.
Central Oxygen Supply.
Post-graduation facility:
 - There are now 7 FCPS courses in SMCH, where FCPS trainees can join.
Others: 
 - Very soon, a cardiac catheterization laboratory will be established.

See also
 List of medical colleges in Bangladesh

References

Further reading
 
 সাতক্ষীরা মেডিকেলের যাত্রা শুরু
 Construction of Satkhira Medical College begins
 ২৫০ শয্যা সাতক্ষীরা মেডিকেল কলেজ হাসপাতালের শুভ উদ্ধোধন

Medical colleges in Bangladesh
Hospitals in Bangladesh
Educational institutions established in 2011
2011 establishments in Bangladesh
Organisations based in Khulna